Dai Shimamura is a Japanese politician who is a member of the House of Councillors of Japan.

Biography 
He graduated in 1985 from Tokyo Dental College and worked in industry until his election in 2011.

References 

1960 births
21st-century Japanese politicians
Living people
Members of the House of Councillors (Japan)